Park Hyeong-ok (born 4 April 1964) is a South Korean boxer. He competed in the men's featherweight event at the 1984 Summer Olympics.

References

External links
 

1964 births
Living people
South Korean male boxers
Olympic boxers of South Korea
Boxers at the 1984 Summer Olympics
Place of birth missing (living people)
Asian Games medalists in boxing
Boxers at the 1986 Asian Games
Asian Games gold medalists for South Korea
Medalists at the 1986 Asian Games
Featherweight boxers